Didymoctenia is a monotypic moth genus in the family Geometridae and subfamily Ennominae which was described by Warren in 1901. Its only species, Didymoctenia exsuperata, the thick-lined bark moth, was first described by Francis Walker in 1860. It is found in Australia.

Life cycle
Early instar caterpillars are brownish white with varying dots with a brown head. As the caterpillar reaches its last instar it turns green and will be almost completely covered in small black dots.

References

Moths of Australia
Boarmiini
Moths described in 1860
Monotypic moth genera